Indore is home to educational institutions ranging from pre-primary through to post-graduate studies. In 2009 Indore became the first city in India to house both an Indian Institute of Management and an Indian Institute of Technology.

Schools 

Schools for primary and higher secondary education in Indore include those listed below:
Little Master International School, Indore
Pakiza Play School, Indore, Primary CBSE School in Indore
SDPS International School
Advanced Academy, Indore
Daly College
Guru Harkrishan Public School, Indore
Gyankriti Schools, An IIT alumni venture
Indus World School
Government Multi Malhar Ashram Higher Secondary School, Indore
Mount Litera Zee School, Indore
Choithram School
Navodaya Vidyalaya Indore
Prestige Public School
Saraswati Gyan Mandir School
S.I.C.A Senior Secondary School, Indore
Sri Sathya Sai Vidya Vihar, Indore
St. Paul Higher Secondary School, Indore
St. Raphael's Girls' Higher Secondary School
The Emerald Heights International School
The Shishukunj International School
Shloka-A Birla School
Queens' College, Indore
Taiba College, Indore
The Vidhyanjali International School
Mar Thoma Hr. Sec School School
Sharda Ramkrishna Vidhya Mandir
Shree Vaishnav Academy
Pakiza Public School, Indore, For Secondary & Higher Secondary Education
New Digamber Public School
Pioneer Convent School
Pioneer Public School
Tulip Kids International School
VIBGYOR Roots and Rise, Indore, Vijay Nagar
VIBGYOR Kids, Indore, Vijay Nagar

Universities 

 DAVV is the state university of Indore
 Symbiosis University of Applied Sciences is the Countries First Skill Development University by Symbiosis Foundation, Pune.
 SVVV, Indore
 SAGE University, Indore
 SVKM's NMIMS
 Dr. A.P.J. Abdul Kalam University
 Oriental University is Indore's first self-funded private university
 Medi-Caps University is a private university 10 km away from Indore city in Pigdamber, Rau
 Prestige University

Colleges

Engineering & Technology 

Following is a list of institutions offering graduate and post-graduate courses in engineering and technology :

 Acropolis Institute of Technology & Research, Indore
 BM College of Technology, Indore
 Chameli Devi Group of Institutions, Indore
 Indian Institute of Technology Indore
 Indore Institute of Science & Technology, Indore
 Institute of Engineering and Technology, DAVV, Indore
 IPS Academy, Institute of Engineering and Science, Indore
 Lakshmi Narain College of Technology & Science (RIT), Indore
 LNCT (BHOPAL) INDORE CAMPUS
 Malwa Institute of Science & Technology, Indore
 Mathura Devi Institute of Technology & Management, Indore
 Medi-Caps
 Patel College of Science and Technology, Indore
 Prestige Institute of Engineering Management and Research, Indore
 Sanghvi Institute of management & Science, Indore
 Shiv Kumar Singh Institute of Technology & Science, Indore
 Shivajirao Kadam Institute of Technology and Management-Technical Campus, Indore
 Shri G.S. Institute of Technology & Science, Indore
 Shri Vaishnav Institute of Technology and Science
 Sri Aurobindo Institute of Technology, Indore
 Sushila Devi Bansal College of Engineering, Indore
 Swami Vivekanand College of Engineering, Indore
 Vikrant Institute of Technology & Management Indore
 Vindhya Institute of Technology & Science, Indore

Management

The following colleges offer courses in Management :-
 Acropolis Institute of Management Studies & Research, Indore
 Indian Institute of Management Indore
 Indore Management Institute, Indore 
 Indore Indira Business School
 Institute of Management Studies, DAVV
 IPS Academy Institute of Business Management and Research
 Jaipuria Institute of Management, Indore
 Pioneer Institute of Professional Studies
 Prestige
 SVKM's Narsee Monjee Institute of Management Studies
 Sri Aurobindo Institute of Management & Science
 Symbiosis University of Applied Sciences, Indore

=Law Colleges
 Liberal College Indore RAU MP* Collegedunia.com

Medicine 
The following colleges offer courses in Medicine.

Index Medical College Hospital & Research Institute
MGM Medical College
Shubhdeep Ayurved Medical College & Hospital (PG Institute), Indore (MP)
Shubhdeep College of Nursing, Indore (MP)
Sri Aurobindo Institute of Medical Sciences

Professional colleges 
Shri Jain Swetamber Professional Academy

Holkar Science College
M.B. Khalsa College
 Cindrebay school of Design

Digital marketing institutes 

 Digital Gurukul
 Digital Marketing Course in Indore 
 Techstack
 Madrid Software

Music 
 Govt. Music College
 Vasant Sangeet Mahavidyalaya
 Sangeet Gurukul Academy
 JR School Of Music
 Saregama College of Arts
 The Drumming Institute
 Pancham Nishad
 Mech Music Academy
 Naad Gunjan Music Academy

Interior Design institutes
Cindrebay school of design
SNDP college
IPS college
INIFD

References 

 
Indore
educational institutions in Indore